The video games sector in South Africa is one of the largest video games markets and Esports scenes in Africa. The video games sector has overtaken the South African market in movies and music in market value and is still rapidly increasing. In 2016 the South African games industry advocacy group, Interactive Entertainment South Africa, stated that the video game market in the country was worth R2.2 billion (US$ 139 million) whilst the domestic games industry was worth R58 million (US$ 5.46 million) in 2014. A 2021 study by Newzoo and Carry1st estimates that 40% (24 million people) of sub-Saharan Africa's video game playing population were located in South Africa.

Game development 

The country has produced to a small number of domestic game development studios such as Free Lives, Celestial Games, 24 Bit Games and Luma Arcade; as of 2022 the only still active developers of the four were Free Lives and 24 Bit Games. A new development studio; BladezGaming, established 2022, has their first game coming out in December 2022. As of 2022 there were 60 active game development studios in South Africa with the majority them being micro-enterprises that employ less than five people; only six of these studios employ more than ten people. Most studios are based in or around the cities of Cape Town and Johannesburg.

Over 90% of South African game development studios report using the Unity game development engine.

Industry challenges 
A lack of local investment and government support in addition to a shortage of game development skills have been identified as key challenges for the industry. Other important challenges include inflexible currency exchange regulations and onerous registration requirements imposed by the South African Films and Publications Board. Since 2016 the Departments of Sports, Art and Culture and Department of Trade and Industry have been discussing which department will take the authority of handling the rights of game developers thereby creating uncertainty within the industry of whom to talk to in government. Due to the difficulties of doing business as a game developer in the country over 80% of game development studios tend to relocate overseas once they become established.

Notable South African games 
Notable video games developed in South Africa include:

 World Turtles - Re: cOg Mission (TBA)

Gaming scene 

Big tech companies like MWEB and Telkom host local server game servers which improve gaming by a lot in South Africa. This helps the improvement of local competitive gaming and brings the local gaming community together easier.

Streaming 
A growing number of South Africans are becoming professional game streamers on platforms such as Twitch and YouTube.

Competitive gaming 
The country's biggest LAN event is the Cape Town based NAG LAN.  Although the gaming community in Cape Town is the second biggest, the uncontested giant in South African gaming is Johannesburg, with Gauteng in its entirety housing more video game players than the rest of the country. Plans are also laid out by SuperSport to start an eSport channel with GINX eSports TV as the demand for streaming eSports keeps on growing.

Compared to the rest of Africa 
South Africa's video gaming compared to the rest of Africa is unchallenged due to the large number of wealthy South Africans living in cities like Durban, Cape Town, Pretoria, Bloemfontein and Johannesburg. With internet infrastructure being more than sufficient to support esports, and with Fibre being almost fully integrated in cities and wealthy suburban areas, the growth in online gaming can only be motivated. Video game developing in the country is not doing well, but events and eSports organizations like Mind Sports South Africa, the Digital Gaming League,  Orena and LANX have jumped up in 2015 with the big demand for eSports tournaments and other video game events in large cities. However, it is only Mind Sports South Africa that continually holds events in all the provinces and runs school events. With gaming in schools also in the rise, Mind Sports South Africa reports that there are now over 30 schools that participate in the official league, with school teams competing on an equal footing with many of the best private clubs in the country.

Nigeria, Kenya and Uganda are the other top game developers in Africa. The video game industry is bringing millions of dollars in for their countries per year. This is in all categories of video games: mobile, PC, Xbox, Nintendo, and PlayStation.

South Africa also being dominant in sport in the continent and all over the world, and the country too has made its mark on the eSport scene as the national South African team has participated in every International e-Sports Federation world Championship since 2009 over a varied number of games and platforms. But Mind Sports South Africa has admitted that the gaming scene needs to mature. Further proof that South Africa is highly respected is that Thomas Brown was selected to referee at the 2016 World Cyber Arena (WCA) in Beijing, and that on 31 July 2016 Jason Batzofin was elected onto International e-Sports Federation Athletes' Commission.

South Africa is ranked 23rd in the world for the video game Counter-Strike: Global Offensive.

Video game retailers and distributors in South Africa 
In South Africa, the majority of video game retailers purchase directly from publisher-authorised distributors for the country. However, some stores source titles from outside of the country due to cheaper prices, titles that aren't officially licensed for South Africa, or hard-to-find releases. Both Core Group (Authorized Nintendo Distributor) and Gamefinity (Authorized Sony Distributor) distribute their licensed products to stores, along with selling directly to the public. This may lead to power imbalances within the market as both companies have the ability to undercut their retail customers or hold stock for themselves. Video game retailing in South Africa has seen a dip over the years due to the improvement of internet services and the increase in the popularity of online gaming. 

South Africa also has a healthy second-hand market.

List of Popular Video Game Retailers (physical and ecommerce) 

 Affordable Gaming
 AWX
 BT Games
 Game 4U
 Incredible Connection
 Koodoo (Gamefinity)
 Loot
 Musica (Defunct)
 Pwned Games
 Raru (Defunct)
 Takealot
 X DVDs & Games

List of Video Game Distributors 

 Apex Interactive
 Core Group (distribution and retail)
 Gamefinity
 Megarom Interactive
 Prima Interactive

References

South African culture